The Gwalior Monument, also known as Ellenborough's Folly, or The Pepperpot, is an octagonal cenotaph about  high, crowned with a bronze dome cast from guns captured from the Marathas. It was erected in 1847 by Lord Ellenborough, the Governor-General of India, as a memorial to the officers and men who fell during the Gwalior War in 1843.

History 
On 13 December 1843 Lord Ellenborough wrote to the Maharani of Gwalior warning her that she should dismiss a usurping regent and that the size of her army should be reduced. Since she did not comply, the Gwalior campaign took place.

Gen. Sir Hugh Gough, violating the treaty of 1804 with Gwalior, forded the Chambal river and invaded the town, which was known for its palaces and riches, on 29 December 1843. The Gwalior War at Maharajpur was fought under Sir Hugh with 14,000 men and 40 guns. The Marathas under Bhagerat Rao Scindia had 18,000 men and 100 guns. The British routed the Mahrathas but suffered 787 casualties. The Mahrathas lost 3000 men and 56 guns.

On the same day at Punniar,  from Maharajpur, the left flank of  Gough's troops under General Grey routed an army of 12,000 Marathas and captured 40 guns.

Design and architecture 

It was designed by Colonel H Goodwyn of the Bengal Engineers  and constructed by Jessop and Company. It was conceptualised by Lord Ellenborough. The base is a single storied white marble structure with a spiral staircase leading to a marble cenotaph on the upper floor from the inside. The top of the monument is built like a Mughal 'chhatri' or umbrella supported by 8 bronze pillars.
The dome of the cenotaph is crowned with a bronze dome cast from guns captured from the Marathas. From here, the Hoogly river can be seen along with a view of the Howrah Bridge and the Vidyasagar Setu. However entry is restricted. The Kolkata Circular Railway passes alongside the memorial between the Eden Gardens and Prinsep Ghat railway stations, and provides a view of this monument.

See also 
 Victoria Memorial (India)
 Lascar War Memorial
 Shaheed Minar, Kolkata

References

External links 

 

Monuments and memorials in Kolkata
History of Kolkata